is a musical and literary movement in Réunion. The term was first used in 1970, and was adapted by Catholic bishop Gilbert Aubry in 1978. It is a traditional movement which seeks to place Réunionese identity within a larger, integrated French identity. In contrast to the  movement, it places more focus on French folklore, and less on the history of French slavery.

History
The term  was coined in 1970 by the poet Jean Albany, which was later adapted by Gilbert Aubry in his conference text Hymne a la Créolie (1978), given in Saint Denis; Aubry, a Catholic bishop, later wrote that his text was the "trigger" for the movement. Works by  practitioners include the poetry collection  (Albany, 1951), the text  (Albany, 1972), the music recording  (Albany and others, 1979; English: Sing Albany), and the poetry collection  (Azéma, 1978; English: Holograph).

Analysis
In contrast to the  movement, which developed some ten years after  was developed,  is a traditional, conservative, and apolitical movement. It does not seek to place Réunion Creole as the sole emancipatory language of the island or its people. The movement, through writing and song, seeks to recuperate a regional identity of France, where the individual identities of its possessions—including Réunion and its historical associations with Portugal, Spain, Madagascar, and the Indian subcontinent—are brought to the fore and integrated with a French identity into a cohesive and unitary national one. The movement, however, disavows any hereditary links between France and Réunion, instead taking an integrative approach.

According to the literary scholar Françoise Lionnet, the movement ignores the value of Réunion Creole as a language, and its move toward integration is ultimately a nationalist reaction. Similarly, the French scholar Valérie Magdelaine-Andrianjafitrimo writes that the movement is a theoretical one of redemption for the Réunionese as members of a French nation-state, where creole "is no longer a patois but not yet a language".

Notes and references

Notes

Citations

Bibliography

 
 
 
 
 
 
 

Réunionnais culture
Literary movements